Llanelli Town Association Football Club are a semi-professional Welsh football club that plays in the Cymru South. The original club was wound up on 22 April 2013 at the High Court in London following a petition presented by HM Revenue and Customs. They were reformed later that year as Llanelli Town AFC and played in the Welsh Premier League. The club finished 12th in the 2018/19 Welsh Premier League season (bottom of the league), and were relegated after failing to gain a Tier 1 Licence. They played in the Cymru South for the 2019–20 season.

Background

The team is based at Stebonheath Park from 1920, having previously playing at the Halfway athletics ground.

Formed in 1896, the club's first honour was the Welsh League division one title claimed in 1913–14 with further wins coming in 1929–30 and 1932–33. Llanelli made several attempts to join The Football League, in 1922, 1923, 1929, 1930, 1931, 1932, 1933, 1947, 1950 and 1951. Despite making an effort to turn professional, the club was not elected. The closest they came was in 1933, where the club received 20 votes compared to 26 for Newport County and 45 for Swindon Town who were re-elected to the Football League Third Division South. Llanelli was a founder member of the Welsh Premier League in 1992, but after only four seasons suffered relegation. Promotion back to the top division was achieved in 1998–99, but 2002–03 saw the team demoted only to return to the top-flight for the 2004–05 season. In 2005 a wealthy business man and his consortium, The Jesco group bought the club. Since then, the club's fortunes have transformed remarkably on the pitch. They have played in Europe for 7 consecutive seasons, they won the Welsh premier league and Loosemores challenge cup in 2008 and won the Welsh Cup in 2011.

2012–13 was difficult financially with three petitions to wind the club up presented by HM Revenue and Customs.

The club was wound up on 22 April 2013 at the High Court in London following a petition presented by HM Revenue and Customs. The formation of a 'phoenix club' of Llanelli Town AFC meant the town of Llanelli was still represented in Welsh football. The new team started in the Welsh Third Division for the 2013–14 season. In 2014-15 they were crowned Third Division champions and as such gained promotion to the Welsh Second Division. In April 2018 the club was crowned champions of the Second Division. After an appeal to the Football Association of Wales against a decision not the grant the club a Tier 1 licence, the club returned to the Welsh Premier League for the 2018–19 season.

History

The game of Association Football was introduced to the townspeople of Llanelli when workers from Staffordshire migrated to the town to work in the 'newest' of the town industries – the Pottery works from 1892 to 1920. Finding the game of rugby Football Union alien to their natural habitat whilst domiciled in the town, workers founded a team to play friendlies versus other teams from the various pottery works industry which had been set up in Swansea and Neath. However, by 1896 interest had waned due in the main to those initial workers returning to their homesteads having successfully instructed their local co-workers into the intricacies of the pottery world. The first playing area had been at 'Cae Blake' in the Furnace area of the town, but when the new Peoples Park in the middle of the town was opened as a recreation area for the town's populace the team had transferred to this new ground. By 1904 with more and more clubs being formed in the south of the principality ardent soccer aficionados decided to resurrect the club under the astute managership of Bert Andrews, a man from Ironbridge, Shropshire, who had remained in the town working in an administrative post at the Llanelli Pottery. The club entered into the Swansea and District League and played their home matches firstly at Tunnel Road and thence to Penyfan Fields.

The Pre-War Era
In season 1911–12 after seven years of consolidation Llanelli AFC became League champions and were also losing finalists in the League Cup. This was the spur that was needed to progress even further and led by another immigrant to the town, W T Morris who hailed from Llanidloes and was a leading entrepreneur in the commercial world of Llanelli, the club decided to become fully professional and applied for membership in both the Southern League and the Welsh League. A further move was necessary to entertain the professional game and Halfway Park some two miles from the town centre was chosen as the new venue. This former cycle stadium was the ideal velodrome for Association Football boasting a grand stand and natural banking, and this was the catalyst, which both league structures sought when sanctioning the club's inclusion in the two participating Leagues. Their first season 1912–13 was an immediate success finishing in 6th position of the Southern League and joint 3rd with Swansea Town in the Welsh League. They were also invited to participate in the FA Cup for the first time, reaching the 3rd Qualifying Round before being beaten by Cardiff City at home. The following season they entered also into the Welsh Senior Cup competition and reached the final at the first time of asking, before losing to Wrexham, the eventual winners in the replay at Oswestry after a 0–0 draw at Pontypridd. It was also during this season that the club achieved its best win to date beating Treharris 17–0 at home in a League game.

The Interwar Period
In the 1919–20 season the reformed club's formats of pre-war years when the 1st team squad contested in both leagues and the team's reserve side participated in the Swansea Senior League. By 1922 it was obvious that to further their ambitions of achieving Football League status a new stadium near the town centre would have to be sought. A piece of ground in the Stebonheath area of the town was purchased and plans were afoot to move the club lock stock and barrel from Halfway. This was achieved just in time for the 1922–23 season, when Bridgend Town were the first visitors. Later on in the season to mark the period of the club's history although proving successful was fraught with financial problems, and at the end of this official opening of the ground the FA Cup holders of the previous season Tottenham Hotspur were invited to participate and were given a rude awakening when the Reds defeated them on the day by 2–1. Later on Burnley and Charlton Athletic were invited to participate in this inaugural season at Stebonheath Park running out winners. At the end of the season which had been a merited success from a playing point of view the club made its first application with Pontypridd Town for inclusion in Football League, Third Division (South), but just failed in their bids when both the member clubs up for re-election, Southend United and Exeter City were both re-elected. For the next three years. Llanelli AFC built up a reputation as one of the leading non-league clubs in the country and in 1925 became the only club to contest every round in the FA Cup from Preliminary to Qualifying and on to the equivalent Third round of today, when they met Fulham at Craven Cottage before losing by the odd goal in a highly emotional game. This period of the club's history although proving successful was fraught with financial problems, and at the end of this emotional season the club terribly in debt and failing to meet their obligations to their players and the two respective management committees of both leagues were forced to resign and the club went into voluntary suspended animation.

By 1928 after three years in the wilderness football enthusiasts in the town including the groundsman/caretaker of Stebonheath Park Jack Goldsborough who had joined the club in 1922 as a player/trainer resolved the resurrect the club once more and fate decreed that they were able to succeed when they took over the fixtures of Aberdare Athletic in the Welsh League, another club by this time who were in dire straits and themselves had had to resign from the Welsh League for the same reason as Llanelli. Their first season was naturally one of consolidation but at the season's end once more they made overtures to the Southern League hierarchy and gained a place for the following season in this prestigious league. For the next five seasons the club were once again on a high, winning trophies once more and just failing on three other occasions in cementing a place in the Football League playing excellent football to the joy of their supporters and it was a golden era for the club, but the bubble was to burst once more. Falling attendances, high outlay of cash on imported players and escalating costs all played their part and first their withdrawal from the Southern League was implemented for the 1934–35 season with the club plying their trade only in the Welsh League 1st Division, where they remained until the outbreak of World War II suffering many defeats including their record defeat of 0–12 at Rexville home of now defunct Lovells Athletic on Boxing Day 1934.

Post-War
At the end of World War II with league football returning to normality, Llanelli AFC returned to the 1st Division of the Welsh League for 1945–46 season and continued in this vain until the 1950 season when with the boom of returning fixtures to a nation starved of highly charged competitive football Llanelli AFC once again gained a place in the prestigious Southern League, together with an influx of Scottish League footballers including one John (Jock) Stein who was to find fame with Glasgow Celtic as a player and manager and a respected manager of both Leeds United and the Scottish National team. Their immediate impact was again one of success gaining FA Cup prowess verses Bristol Rovers in a Third round tie replay in 1950–51 season and before losing in a second replay and a Second Round encounter with Colchester United in 1952–53 season and Northampton Town in the next, but as ever problems were to beset the club once more. Falling gates, indifferent seasons meant fewer people through the turnstiles and by 1958 they had to seek re-election to both the Southern and Welsh League. They were granted a stay in the Southern League whilst had to be relegated in the Welsh League Division II (West). But a shock to the system was to be suffered when the Welsh FA refused to sanction their stay in the Southern League and they were left in limbo with an all-time low for their future for the 1958–59 season. Under the astute managership of Wilf Grant an England B International, promotion was gained in that season and at least they were back in the higher echelon of Welsh League football. Despite their achievements and an upsurge in their finances and an open door to Southern League once again the Welsh FA spurned their pleas after being accepted and they remained 'in situ' in this league until the advent of the League of Wales in 1992–93 season when they became founder members.

League of Wales Era
After an initial successful season the club fell away once more, again due to financial constraints and by the end of the 1995–96 season were relegated once again to the Welsh League. It took a further four years for them to achieve promotion, gaining a place in the League of Wales as runners-up to Ton Pentre who had spurned their right as champions in season 1999–2000. Following their return to the League of Wales the club had a see-saw existence. In 2003, the club lost its league status, but a successful campaign back in the Welsh League brought a prompt return of Premiership football to Steboneath Park. Disagreements over the playing budget led to the resignation of promotion-winning manager, Neil O'Brien and chairman Robert Jones turned to former Cardiff boss Eddie May. But a disastrous nine-match losing start to the campaign saw Nick Tucker arrive from Taffs Well to take over in mid-October 2004. The Reds gained their first win of the season at the 11th attempt and by the end of the season had hauled themselves into 14th position, a remarkable recovery. Summer 2005 saw the first full-time footballer at Stebonheath since the Jock Stein era of the 1950s, with eight professionals under Spanish director of football, Lucas Cazorla Luque. Although the Spaniard parted company midway through the season, the Reds went on to finish runners-up and clinch a first-ever place in Europe under manager Peter Nicholas. They became one of the few Welsh clubs to progress past the first round in Europe, beating Swedish outfit Gefle IF, going out bravely in the next round to Danish giants, Odense BK 6–1 on aggregate. Their European exertions affected their league campaign, but despite a mid-season slump, they rallied in the closing stages to clinch third place and an InterToto Cup spot. The Reds then enjoyed a superb season in 2007/8, clinching their first-ever Welsh Premier title with three games to go and a first appearance in the UEFA Champions League, where they lost to Latvian champions FK Ventspils 4–1 on aggregate, after winning the home leg 1–0. Failure to repeat the feat in the following campaign resulted in the dismissal of manager Nicholas after four years at the helm, he was replaced by veteran defender Andy Legg. Legg's first game in charge was the 1–0 victory over Scottish Premier League side, Motherwell. The Reds lost the return leg 3–0. Legg guided Llanelli to their first ever Welsh cup win by beating Bangor City 4–1 at Parc Y Scarlets, Llanelli.

Reformation
The club were wound up in April 2013 over an unpaid tax debt amounting to £21,000. Distraught manager Bob Jeffries thought there was only one man to save the club and started making calls to local celebrity multi-millionaire David Craddock, Director of Davies Craddock Limited. David has an endless list of contacts in the football world and is often seen around Britain in VIP rooms of professional clubs. Weekly calls turned into daily calls which he answered in his very busy schedule and when Mr Craddock had a tour of the Stadium and met FAW’s Neil Dymock, he felt ready to take on the mission. 
They were reformed as Llanelli Town later that year and were placed in the Welsh Football League Division Three for the start of the 2013–14 season. They are considered by the FAW to be a direct continuation of the same club.

Badge History
Llanelli Town A.F.C. Crest History

Stadium

The club's home ground is Stebonheath Park, which has a capacity of 3,700. In recent years, The Reds have played numerous European games away from their home ground due to the limited seating capacity. Games have been played at Stradey Park, the former home of the Llanelli Scarlets rugby team, The Liberty Stadium in Swansea, Richmond Park, Carmarthen and Parc y Scarlets, Llanelli.

The first ground improvement started in the summer of 2008 by building a seated stand to accommodate 300 supporters. This takes the Stebonheath Park seated capacity to 1,003 – therefore making it a UEFA-compliant stadium for European football.

Llanelli in Europe

2006–07 UEFA Cup
Llanelli first ever game in Europe was against Swedish team Gefle IF. Going a goal down early on in the game at the Swedish national stadium, Llanelli rallied and won the game 2–1 thanks to a debut goal from Rhys Griffiths and a goal from Jacob Mingorance. The return leg was played at Stradey Park in front of a crowd of 5,000, it finished 0–0. The draw for the second qualifying round put them up against Danish side Odense Boldklub. The Reds lost the away leg 1–0. The home leg was played at Swansea's Liberty stadium, Antonio Corbishierio put the Reds 1–0 up on the night to bring the aggregate scores level, Odense destroyed Llanelli's hopes of progression by running out 5–1 winners on the night and 6–1 on aggregate.

2007–08 UEFA Intertoto Cup
Llanelli qualified for the Intertoto Cup after finishing third in the Welsh Premier League behind The New Saints and Rhyl. The Reds travelled to the Lithuanian capital Vilnius for the first leg of the first-round game against FK Vėtra. Llanelli started the game well, even with a severely depleted squad they managed to take the lead with a fine volley by Andrew Mummford, the brave Reds side went on to lose the game 3–1. A magnificent return leg played at Carmarthen's Richmond Park, saw Llanelli come agonizingly close to qualifying. They took the game from 3–2 down at half time to score a last minute goal to make it 5–3, unfortunately there was not enough time for Llanelli to grab a winner, they went out on away goals with an aggregate score of 6–6. Talismanic striker, Rhys Griffiths bagged a hat trick, Wyn Thomas and Andy Legg got the other two goals.

2008–09 UEFA Champions League
Llanelli qualified for the UEFA Champions League after winning the Welsh Premier League. The Reds were drawn against FK Ventspils of Latvia in the first qualifying round. In a close match at a sell out Stebonheath Park, Llanelli ran out 1–0 winners thanks to a goal from defender, Stuart Jones. The Reds then went to Latvia to try to defend this slender lead. Llanelli could not repeat their heroics of the previous week and lost the game 4–0 to bow out 4–1 on aggregate.

2009–10 UEFA Europa League
Llanelli's first appearance in the newly formatted Europa League saw them drawn against Scottish Premier League side, Motherwell. The game was played at Airdrie's stadium with a strong contingent making the long journey north from South Wales. The Red's pulled off a major shock by beating the SPL side 1–0 with a first half goal by Stuart Jones. The return leg, which was played at Parc Y Scarlets was a different story. Motherwell, backed by 3000 travelling fans defeated the Reds comfortably, 3–0.

2010–11 UEFA Europa League
A second-placed finish in Andy Legg's first season as manager saw Llanelli play European football for the 5th consecutive season. They were drawn against Lithuanian minnows FK Tauras Tauragein the first qualifying round. The first leg, which was played in front of a sell out Steboneath Park crowd finished 2–2, centre backs Wyn Thomas and Stuart Jones got Llanelli's goals, Chris Holloway was also sent off and handed a 2 match ban. The second leg was played at the Lithuanian national football stadium, Tauras took the lead due to some poor defending only for Chris Llewellyn to equalise. Llanelli again conceded from some poor defending, this time from a corner. The battling Reds side equalised once again, a ball over the top led to Jason Bowen beating the offside trap, he raced clear and neatly slid the ball past the Tauras keeper. With extra time fast approaching, Llanelli had Rhys Griffiths and Craig Moses sent off, somewhat controversially. The Tauras players seemed to make a meal with every challenge. Extra time proved too much for the tired Reds side as Tauras ran out 3–2 winners on the night and 5–4 on aggregate.

2011–12 UEFA Europa League
Llanelli were drawn against Dinamo Tbilisi. The first leg was played at Parc Y Scarlets. Llanelli, who were missing 5 key players, stunned the Georgians by taking the game 2–1, with a brace coming from Jordan Follows. Tbilisi pulled a goal back in stoppage time with a penalty. The Reds approached the second leg in with confidence, key players returning and a 2–1 advantage. Hopes of progressing were quickly dashed as a rampant Tbilisi side knocked in 5 goals without reply. Llanelli went out 6–2 on aggregate.

European record
Q= Qualifying

Honours

League of Wales / Welsh Premier League (Step 1)
Winners 2007–08
Runners-up 2005–06, 2008–09, 2009–10
Welsh League Cup
Winners 2007–08
Runners-up 2010–11
Welsh Cup
Winners 2010–11
Runners-up 1913–14, 2007–08
FAW Premier Cup
Runners-up 2007–08
Southern League (as a top division)
Best ever finish Fifth in 1950–51
Southern League Division 2
Best ever finish Third in 1919–20
Southern League (Western Division)
Runners-up 1930–31
Welsh League Division 1 / (Step 1)
Winners 1913–14, 1929–30, 1932–33, 1970–71, 1976–77, 1977–78, 2003–04
Runners-up 1930–31, 1933–34, 1959–60, 1972–73, 1996–97, 1998–99
Welsh League Division 2 West (Step 2)
Winners 1957–58
Welsh League Division 3 (Step 4)
Winners 2014–2015
Welsh League Cup
Winners 1929–30, 1931–32, 1974–75
Runners-up 1930–31, 1933–34, 1948–49, 1959–60, 1960–61, 1989–90, 2003–04
West Wales Senior Cup
Winners 1930–31, 1947–48, 1950–51, 1952–53, 1963–64, 1967–68, 1970–71, 1976–77, 1999–00, 2008/09
Runners-up 1924–25, 1931–32, 1934–35, 1938–39, 1948–49, 1953–54, 1954–55, 1955–56, 1957–58, 1959–60, 1961–62, 1964–65, 1965–66, 1966–67, 1971–72, 1972–73, 1977–78, 1978–79, 1989–90, 1990–91, 1998–99
Shared 1962–63 (with Swansea Town)

Players

Latest squad

Managers 

 John Love (1952–54) 
 Alwyn Mainwaring (1992–93)
 Gil Lloyd (1993–96)
 Leighton James (1998–00)
 John Lewis (2000)
 Mark Evans (2000–01)
 Gary Proctor (2001)
 Ray John (interim) (2001)
 Jason Jones (2001–02)
 Peter Nicholas (2002)
 Leighton James (2002–03)
 Neil O'Brien (2003–04)
 Eddie May (2004)
 Nicky Tucker (2004–05)
 Peter Nicholas (Aug 2005–2009)
 Lucas Cazorla (July 2006 – June 2007)
 Andy Legg (April 2009 – November 2012)
 Bob Jeffrey (November 2012 – May 2016)
 Andrew Hill (June 2016 – October 2019))
 Wayne Stephens (October 2019 – November 2019 (Caretaker Manager)
 Mark Dickeson (November 2019 – November 2020 )
 Andy Legg (November 2020 – November 2021)
 Lee John (November 2021 –)

References

External links
Official site

 
Sport in Llanelli
Association football clubs established in 1896
Southern Football League clubs
Cymru Premier clubs
1896 establishments in Wales
Welsh Football League clubs
Cymru South clubs